Oncina is a surname. Notable people with the surname include:

 Ana Oncina (born 1989), Spanish comic book illustrator and author
 Juan Oncina (1925–2009), Spanish tenor
 Noelia Oncina (born 1976), Spanish handball player